Maxomys is a genus of rodents, widespread in Southeast Asia. They are mid-sized rodents, similar to rats, that live on the ground of tropical rainforests. There they build nests, padded with fallen leaves from trees. They feed on roots, fallen fruit, and other plants, as well as insects. All species are shy and avoid food from humans.

The genus Maxomys was originally considered a subgenus of Rattus, the rat genus. When it became established as its own genus in the 1960s, Maxomys was often combined with the genera Niviventer and Leopoldamys. In the currently accepted taxonomy, Musser, Marshall, and Boeadi established Maxomys in 1979.

List of species
Genus Maxomys - rajah rats:

Mountain spiny rat, Maxomys alticola Thomas, 1888, Borneo
Small spiny rat, Maxomys baeodon Thomas, 1894, Borneo
Bartels's spiny rat, Maxomys bartelsii Jentink, 1910, Java
Dollman's spiny rat, Maxomys dollmani Ellerman, 1941, Sulawesi
Hellwald's spiny rat, Maxomys hellwaldii Jentink, 1878, Sulawesi
Sumatran spiny rat, Maxomys hylomyoides Robinson and Kloss, 1916, Sumatra
Malayan mountain spiny rat, Maxomys inas Bonhote, 1906, Malayan Peninsula
Fat-nosed spiny rat, Maxomys inflatus Robinson and Kloss, 1916, Sumatra
Mo's spiny rat, Maxomys moi Robinson and Kloss, 1922, Vietnam, Laos
Musschenbroek's spiny rat, Maxomys musschenbroekii Jentink, 1878, Sulawesi
Chestnut-bellied spiny rat, Maxomys ochraceiventer Thomas, 1894, Borneo
Pagai spiny rat, Maxomys pagensis Miller, 1903, Mentawai Islands
Palawan spiny rat, Maxomys panglima Robinson, 1921, Palawan and neighboring islands
Rajah spiny rat, Maxomys rajah Thomas, 1894, Malayan Peninsula, Sumatra, Borneo
Red spiny rat, Maxomys surifer Miller, 1900, Sumatra, Java, Borneo
Maxomys tajuddinii Achmadi, Maryanto & Maharadatunkamsi, 2012, Malay Peninsula, Sumatra, Borneo
Watts's spiny rat, Maxomys wattsi Musser, 1991, Sulawesi
Whitehead's spiny rat, Maxomys whiteheadi Thomas, 1894, Malayan Peninsula, Sumatra, Borneo

References

Further reading 

 Ronald M. Nowak: Walker's Mammals of the World. Johns Hopkins University Press, 1999 
 G.G. Musser, J.T. Marshall Jr. & B. Boeadi: Definition and contents of the Sundaic genus Maxomys (Rodentia, Muridae). In: Journal of Mammalogy 1979, Bd. 60, S. 592-606.

''This article is based on a translation of the corresponding article on the German Wikipedia.

 
Rodent genera